The 1988 European Indoors was a women's tennis tournament played on indoor carpet courts at the Saalsporthalle Allmend in Zürich in Switzerland and was part of the Category 3 of the 1988 WTA Tour. It was the fifth edition of the tournament and was held from 17 October through 23 October 1988. First-seeded Pam Shriver won the singles title  and earned $40,000 first-prize money.

Finals

Singles

 Pam Shriver defeated  Manuela Maleeva 6–3, 6–4
 It was Shriver's 3rd singles title of the year and the 21st of her career.

Doubles

 Isabelle Demongeot /  Nathalie Tauziat defeated  Claudia Kohde-Kilsch /  Helena Suková 6–3, 6–3
 It was Demongeot's 2nd title of the year and the 3rd of her career. It was Tauziat's 2nd title of the year and the 3rd of her career.

Prize money and ranking points

Notes

References

External links
 ITF tournament edition details
 Tournament draws

European Indoors
Zurich Open
1988 in Swiss tennis